Albert Jan Maat (born 8 February 1953 in Heino, Overijssel) is a Dutch politician and Member of the European Parliament. He is a member of the Christian Democratic Appeal, which is part of the European People's Party, and sits on the European Parliament's Committee on Agriculture and Rural Development and its Committee on Fisheries.

He is also a substitute for the Committee on Budgetary Control, the Committee on Budgets, the Subcommittee on Human Rights, and the delegation to the EU–Chile Joint Parliamentary Committee. He is vice-chair of the delegation to the EU–Kazakhstan, EU–Kyrgyzstan and EU–Uzbekistan Parliamentary Cooperation Committees, and for relations with Tajikistan, Turkmenistan and Mongolia.

Career
 Various jobs, CBTB (Christian Farmers' and Horticulturists' Association) (1977–1995)
 Secretary, NLTO (Northern Netherlands Agricultural and Horticultural Organisation) (1995–1999)
 Chairman, Drenthe CDA and member of CDA executive (1996–1999)
 Member and CDA group chairman, Eelde Municipal Council (1990–1997)
 Member of executive board of ICCO (Ecumenical Coordination Committee on Development Projects) (1995–1999)
 Member of governing body of Christian Agricultural College, Dronten (1995–2001)
 Mr Maat is currently Chairman of the supervisory committee of the Northern Education Group, AOC Terra and Dollard College, and a board member of the Alfa Omega Foundation
 Member of the European Parliament (since 1999)

External links
 Official website
 European Parliament biography
 

1953 births
Living people
People from Raalte
Christian Democratic Appeal politicians
Christian Democratic Appeal MEPs
MEPs for the Netherlands 1999–2004
MEPs for the Netherlands 2004–2009
Municipal councillors in Drenthe